Marcin Chmiest (born February 12, 1979 in Kraków) is a Polish footballer (forward).

Career

Club
In May 2005, he moved to Legia Warsaw on a one-year contract.

In 2007, he played for SC Braga, on loan from Odra Wodzisław Śląski.

In July 2007, he signed a three-year contract with Arka Gdynia.

In February 2010, he moved to Odra Wodzisław on a half-year contract.

In February 2011, he joined Sandecja Nowy Sącz on a half-year contract.

References

External links
 
 

1979 births
Living people
Polish footballers
S.C. Braga players
Hutnik Nowa Huta players
GKS Bełchatów players
Legia Warsaw players
Odra Wodzisław Śląski players
Arka Gdynia players
Sandecja Nowy Sącz players
Skra Częstochowa players
Footballers from Kraków
Association football forwards

Polish expatriate sportspeople in Portugal